Agulhas Negras Peak is the fifth-highest mountain in Brazil, standing at  above sea level, making it one of the highest in the Brazilian Highlands. It is located in Itatiaia National Park, in the Mantiqueira range, on the border of the states of Rio de Janeiro and Minas Gerais. It is the highest point in the state of Rio de Janeiro, the third-highest in Minas Gerais, and the second-highest in the Mantiqueira range.

The climb to the top was first attempted by Franklin Massena in 1856. Further attempts were made by André Rebouças in 1878 and by Horácio de Carvalho in 1898, but the summit was only reached by Carlos Spierling and Osvaldo Leal in 1919.

Etymology
Its name means Black Needles Peak, because of the sharp dark rocks on its top, which give it a distinctive shape. The peak's massif is known as Itatiaia, which means "stone with many sharp points" in the Tupi language. The highest rock, with the summit, is known as Itatiaiaçu, or simply Açu (a Tupi suffix meaning "big") among Brazilian mountaineers.

Geography
Agulhas Negras Peak can be seen to the northwest of Resende when driving between São Paulo and Rio de Janeiro on the Via Dutra highway, but this is only possible at a few points on the road, because a lower mountain range closer to the road stands in the line-of-sight at most other nearby spots.

It is accessible by a gravel road (BR-485) from the BR-354 federal highway at the Garganta do Registro mountain pass, via Itatiaia National Park's north entrance.

Climate

Elevation measurements

For years, Agulhas Negras was thought to be the highest mountain in Brazil. The title later went to Pico da Bandeira, in the Caparaó range between the states of Minas Gerais and Espírito Santo (now known to be at ).

Agulhas Negras remains the highest point in the state of Rio de Janeiro.

In 2015, IBGE completed a new and more accurate mapping of the Brazilian territory regarding the geoid, the irregular imaginary surface based on the Earth's gravitational field that is the reference for altitude measurements. This led the institution to recalculate the altitude of the mountains measured in the earlier project, according to the new reference. The new data were published in February 2016.

Notes

References

Mountains of Brazil
Highest points of Brazilian states
Bornhardts
Landforms of Minas Gerais
Landforms of Rio de Janeiro (state)